Marina Shumakova (born 22 July 1983) is a table tennis player from Kazakhstan. She is one of Kazakhstan's top players.

She competed at the 2008 Summer Olympics, reaching the preliminary round of the singles competition.

References
2008 Olympic profile

1983 births
Living people
Kazakhstani female table tennis players
Table tennis players at the 2008 Summer Olympics
Olympic table tennis players of Kazakhstan
Place of birth missing (living people)